The Southern States Wrestling (SSW) Heavyweight Championship is the primary professional wrestling championship in Southern States Wrestling. It was first won by The Tennessee Equalizer when he defeated George Hiatt in Elizabethton, Tennessee on February 16, 1991. The title is generally defended in the Southern United States, most often in its home base in East Tennessee, but also as far away as Virginia and West Virginia. In August 2004, then champion Ray Idol began wrestling for rival promotion NWA Championship Wrestling. Although he was immediately stripped of the title, Idol continued defending a different NWA Championship Wrestling-version under the SSW name. However, this was short-lived and the title became a regular title within the main promotion. There are 41 recognized champions with a total of 69 title reigns and 8 vacancies. Daniel Richards is the current champion in his first reign. He won the title by defeating Beau James on the November 03, 2018 episode of SSW in  Gray, Tennessee.

Combined reigns 

{| class="wikitable sortable" style="text-align: center"
!Rank
!Wrestler
!No. ofreigns
!Combineddays
|-
!1
| Beau James || 8 ||style="background-color:#bbeeff| 784-1,012¤
|-
!2
|style="background-color:#FFE6BD"| Daniel Richards † || 1 || +
|-
!3
| Eric Darkstorm || 2 || 640
|-
!4
| DeAndre Jackson || 1 || 620
|-
!5
| Ricky Harrison || 3 || 599
|-
!6
| Frank Parker || 3 ||style="background-color:#bbeeff| 562-592
|-
!7
| Ray Idol || 4 ||style="background-color:#bbeeff| 418-668¤
|-
!8
| Wayne Rogers || 2 || 403
|-
!9
| Tennessee Equalizer/Krunch The Equalizer || 3 ||style="background-color:#bbeeff| 373-562¤
|-
!10
| Cody Ices || 1 || 283
|-
!11
| Steve Flynn || 3 || 254
|-
!12
| Iron Cross || 3 ||style="background-color:#bbeeff| 252¤
|-
!13
| Stan Lee || 1 || 250
|-
!14
| Mike Samson || 2 || 212
|-
!15
| Jesse Taylor || 3 ||style="background-color:#bbeeff| 200-228¤
|-
!16
| The War Machine || 2 || 197
|-
!17
| G.Q. Stratus || 1 || 196
|-
!18
| Tracy Smothers || 1 || 190
|-
!19
| The Mongolian Stomper || 1 ||style="background-color:#bbeeff| 186-216¤
|-
!20
| Kyle Kool || 1 || 162
|-
!21
| K. C. Thunder || 2 || 121
|-
!22
| Jimmy Golden || 1 || 119
|-
!rowspan=2|23
| Brian Overbay || 2 || 111
|-
| Skyfire || 1 || 111
|-
!25
| Iron Man || 1 || 104
|-
!26
| Chic White || 1 || 97
|-
!27
| Dan Cooley || 1 || 68
|-
!28
| Wayne Adkins || 1 || 61
|-
!29
| Robbie Cassidy || 1 || 59
|-
!30
| John Noble || 1 || 57
|-
!31
| Johnny Thunder || 1 || 54
|-
!32
| Scotty McKeever || 1 ||style="background-color:#bbeeff| 47-75¤
|-
!33
| Eddie Bruiser || 1 || 42
|-
!34
| Danny Christian || 1 || 33
|-
!35
| Heinrich Von Keller || 1 ||style="background-color:#bbeeff| 31-62¤
|-
!36
| Brad Batten || 1 ||style="background-color:#bbeeff| 26-57¤
|-
!37
| Kyle Matthews || 1 || 26
|-
!38
| Steve Phillips || 1 || 15
|-
!39
| Stan Sierra || 1 || 11
|-
!40
| Buddy Landel || 1 || <1
|-
!41
| Danny Ray || 1 ||style="background-color:#bbeeff| N/A¤
|-

References

External links
 Official Tag Team Championship Title History
  SSW Heavyweight Championship
Heavyweight wrestling championships
Regional professional wrestling championships